Noh Si-hwan (노시환; born 6 September 1992) is a male South Korean long-distance runner. He competed in the marathon event at the 2015 World Championships in Athletics in Beijing, China.

See also
 South Korea at the 2015 World Championships in Athletics

References

South Korean male marathon runners
South Korean male long-distance runners
Living people
Place of birth missing (living people)
1992 births
World Athletics Championships athletes for South Korea
Athletes (track and field) at the 2014 Asian Games
Asian Games competitors for South Korea
21st-century South Korean people